John S. Dryzek (born 23 June 1953) is a Centenary Professor at the Centre for Deliberative Democracy and Global Governance at the University of Canberra's Institute for Governance and Policy Analysis.

Education 
Dryzek has a B.A. (Honours) in Economics and Politics from the University of Lancaster (1974), an M.Sc. in Politics from the University of Strathclyde (1976) and a Ph.D. in Government and Politics from the University of Maryland (1980).

Career
Before moving to the University of Canberra (Australia), Dryzek was Distinguished Professor of Political Science and Australian Research Council Federation Fellow at the Australian National University. He is a Fellow of the Academy of Social Sciences in Australia, former Head of the Departments of Political Science at the Universities of Oregon and Melbourne and of the Social and Political Theory program at the Australian National University (ANU), and former editor of the Australian Journal of Political Science.

In a 2010 poll of American political theorists, Dryzek was listed in the top 20 ‘scholars doing excellent work today whose work will be influential during the next 20 years’, and was the most highly ranked scholar based outside North America.

In 2014, Dryzek was awarded the Australian Research Council Laureate Fellowship for the project Deliberative worlds: democracy, justice and a changing world.

Working in both political theory and empirical social science, Dryzek is best known for his contributions in the areas of democratic theory and practice and environmental politics. One of the instigators of the 'deliberative turn' in democratic theory, he has published numerous books in this area with Oxford University Press, Cambridge University Press, and Polity Press. His work in environmental politics ranges from green political philosophy to studies of environmental discourses and movements to global climate governance, and he has published five books in this area with Oxford University Press, Cambridge University Press, and Basil Blackwell.

Dryzek has also worked on comparative studies of democratization, post-positivist public policy analysis, and the history and philosophy of social science. His current research emphasizes global justice, governance in the Anthropocene (where human activity is understood as a major environmental factor), and cultural variety in deliberative practice.

Dryzek has also been influential in the related fields of international relations and international political theory. He was an early proponent of global democracy, helping to develop the concept and illustrating why the exercise of power beyond the nation-state requires democratization. Drawing on his work in deliberative (or discursive) democracy, Dryzek has depicted how contending discourses operate in world politics and the space this opens for reflexivity and democratization. Also in line with previous work, Dryzek has highlighted how highly complex issue areas - notably climate governance - can be democratized through deliberation and public reason. Drawing from his work on deliberation and public reason, Dryzek has argued that many critiques of deliberative democracy can be addressed through greater discursive representation. More generally, Dryzek has undertaken discipline-leading work on global civil society, non-state actors, and representation in world politics.

Bibliography 
 
 
 Dryzek, John S. (1990). Discursive democracy: Politics, Policy, and Political Science. Cambridge: Cambridge University Press.

References

External links 
 Profile page: John Dryzek Centre for Deliberative Democracy and Global Governance, Institute for Governance and Policy Analysis, University of Canberra

1953 births
Living people
Australian political philosophers
Australian political scientists
Academic staff of the Australian National University
University of Maryland, College Park alumni
Green thinkers
Fellows of the Academy of the Social Sciences in Australia